Esterella is a 1923 German silent film directed by Joe Francis.

Cast
In alphabetical order
 Jane Denins 
 Maria Forescu 
 Helmut Göze
 Lissi Lind
 Marga Reck as Esterella  
 Ludwig Rex 
 Eduard Rothauser

References

Bibliography
 Rège, Philippe. Encyclopedia of French Film Directors, Volume 1. Scarecrow Press, 2009.

External links

1923 films
Films of the Weimar Republic
German silent feature films
Films directed by Joe Francis
German black-and-white films